Prince Imperial Waneun (Hangul:완은군, Hanja: 完恩君) (1 August 1842 - 28 October 1881) was a prince of the Korean Empire and a member of the Joseon dynasty royal family. He was a descendant of Prince Namyeon and an illegitimate son of Heungseon Daewongun and his concubine Kyeseongwol. He was an older half-brother of Gojong of Korea and Prince Imperial Heung, and a half-uncle of Prince Youngsun and Emperor Sunjong of Korea. His real name was Yi Jae-seon (hangul: 이재선, hanja: 李載先). His Chinese name is unknown.

Life 
His actual birth year is unknown, but is thought to be around 1841–1842, or 1847. He was born in Unhyeongung, Ahguk-dong in Hanseong. He was the first, though illegitimate, son of Prince Heungseon, who was himself the son of Prince Namyeon and a distant descendant of Prince Inpyeong. His early life is unknown. One opinion said that he was foolish or unintelligent.

He was married to Lady Shin of Pyeongsan Shin clan, a daughter of Shin Seok-wan. They had two known daughters. The first daughter was Yi Chang-hwa, who was married to Shin Hyeong-kyun. The other daughter's name is unknown. Later, his father's legal wife, Grand Internal Princess Consort Sunmok, gave birth to Yi Jae-myeon and Yi Myeong-bok, who was later the 26th King of the Joseon dynasty and the First Emperor of Korea.

Military career
At some stage, he passed the tests to become a military official (무과 武科). In 1863, his younger half-brother Gojong ascended to the King of Joseon and Queen Sinjeong was appointed regent, because King Gojong was still a child. Also his father Prince Heungseon was appointed Daewongun. Some months later, Queen Dowager Hyoyu was given the regent title for his father Prince Heungseon. After 1864, he was appointed to more military posts.

In November 1874, his father, Heungseon Daewongun, whose supporters were planning a coup, was deported, which according to legend angered him.  Yi Jae-sun also supported Heungseon Daewongun because he was a low-ranked military officer. other participants were Wijeongchoksa Group(위정척사파)

Death

In 1881, some near peoples of Heungseon Daewongun was making to some peoples soldiers there was execution time was September in 1881. but, one entry of Kwangju castle of Kyeonggi, he was embroidery to police Uigeumbu. so arrested to main point coup's leader 30's and there was killed. so some government's Official was attack and death sentence needs to him. a different accuser was Yi Yun-yong of the Ubong Lee clan, he was the brother-in-law of him and Yi Yun-yong was report of direct to the King Gojong and Queen Min. other opinion was his execution ground was Seodaemun(Donuimun) in Hanseongs.

He was arrested and imprisoned in Jeju prisons. On October 28, 1881 he was poison as punishment by King Gojong, and so he died in his 40's. His burial is in Yangju in Gyeonggi and later his grave was moved to Wangsipri-dong in Seoul, In 1909, it was removed to Siheung-dong in Seoul. so later, his grave's situation information of lose the earth, the present is there's no telling.

On October 15, 1907 he was appointed to Prince Imperial Waneun, by emperor Sunjong of Korea, his half-nephew. but his posthumous title was not granted.

Ancestry

Family
 Great-Great-Grandfather
 Yi Jin-ik (25 September 1728 - 26 April 1796)
 Great-Great-Grandmother
 Lady Jo of the Hanyang Jo clan (한양 조씨 부인)
 Great-Grandfather
 Yi Byeong-won (이병원) (6 April 1752 - 11 November 1822)
 Great-Grandmother
 Lady Jeong of the Yeonil Jeong clan (초취 부인 연일 정씨) 
 Grandfather
 Yi Gu, Prince Namyeon (22 August 1788 - 19 March 1836) (이구 남연군)
 Grandmother
 Princess Consort Min of the Yeoheung Min clan (26 June 1788 - 1831) (군부인 여흥 민씨)
Father
 Yi Ha-Eung, Grand Internal Prince Heungseon (21 December 1820 – 22 February 1898) (이하응 흥선대원군)
 Mother
 Gyeseongwol (계성월, 桂成月)
 Wife
 Princess Consort Shin of the Pyeongsan Shin clan (11 August 1844 -  ?) (군부인 평산 신씨) 
 Father-in-law: Shin Seok-wan (신석완, 申錫完)
 Daughters
 Yi Chang-hwa (1867 - 1937) (이창화)
 Son-in-law: Shin Hyeong-kyun of the Pyeongsan Shin clan (1870 - 1940) (신형균, 申珩均)
 Unnamed daughter 
 Son
 Adoptive son: Yi Gwan-yong (자작 이관용, 李土 灌鎔) (13 February 1891 - ?)

Popular culture
 Portrayed by Kim Hui-ra in the 1990-1991 MBC TV series 500 Years of Joseon Dynasty.
 Portrayed by Park Hyeon in the 1995 KBS2 TV series The Radiant Dawn.
 Portrayed by Lee Woo-suk  in the 2001-2002 KBS2 TV series Empress Myeongseong.

See also 
 Heungseon Daewongun
 Unhyeongung
 Gojong of Korea
 Prince Imperial Yeongseon
 Prince Imperial Heung
 Sunjong of Korea
History of Korea

External links 
 이재선:한국역대인물종합정보 
 이재선 naver 
 [역사속의 오늘] 8월29일/ 마오쩌둥, 인민공사 설립 The Chosun 2003.08.28. 
 갑신정변과 구한말 조선의 상황 The News of churches&religion 2014.07.29. 
 [신병주의 역사의창] 왕의 형으로 사는 비운 세계일보 2017.02.21.

References

Heirs apparent who never acceded
19th-century Korean people
1881 deaths
House of Yi
Korean princes
Korean military personnel
Joseon politicians
Executed royalty
People executed by starvation
Deaths by poisoning
Korean murderers